The Europe and Africa Zone is one of the three zones of regional Davis Cup competition in 2012.

In the Europe and Africa Zone there are four different groups in which teams compete against each other to advance to the next group.

Draw

Seeds:
 
 
 
 

Remaining Nations:

Draw

 and  relegated to Group II in 2013.

First round

Great Britain vs. Slovakia

Finland vs. Netherlands

Denmark vs. Slovenia

Second round

Israel vs. Portugal

Belgium vs. Great Britain

Netherlands vs. Romania

Slovenia vs. South Africa

First-round play-off

Romania vs. Finland

Second-round play-off

Portugal vs. Slovak Republic

Finland vs. Denmark

References

External links
Draw Results

Europe Africa Zone Group I
Davis Cup Europe/Africa Zone